Menna Tarek Sayed Saber (born 1 March 2000) is an Egyptian footballer who plays as a forward for Saudi Arabian club Al Shabab FC and the Egypt women's national team. She was previously playing in El Gouna FC wearing number 11 and has played in the Turkish Women's First Football League for Fatih Vatan Spor with jersey number 74.

Early life
Tarek was born in Cairo, Egypt on 1 March 1999.

Playing career

Club 

Tarek moved in November 2018 to Turkey to join Fatih Vatan Spor, who play in the Turkish Women's First Football League. She scored one goal in the first match with her new club.

International
Tarek appeared for the Egypt women's national football team  at the 2016 Africa Women Cup of Nations held in Cameroon.

References

External links 
 

1999 births
Living people
Footballers from Cairo
Egyptian women's footballers
Women's association football forwards
Fatih Vatan Spor players
Egypt women's international footballers
Egyptian expatriate footballers
Egyptian expatriate sportspeople in Turkey
Expatriate women's footballers in Turkey
Saudi Women's Premier League players
Egyptian expatriate sportspeople in Saudi Arabia